Aulon was a town apart of ancient Messenia mentioned by Stephanus of Byzantium and Pausanias.

Its site is unlocated.

References

Populated places in ancient Messenia
Former populated places in Greece
Lost ancient cities and towns